It's 2 Easy is the second studio album by Australian rock band the Easybeats. Released on 24 March 1966, the album featured four hit singles; "Wedding Ring", "Sad and Lonely and Blue", "Women (Make Me Feel Alright)" and "Come And See Her".

Production
The album was recorded during their tour of Melbourne at Armstrong Studios and at EMI Studios in Sydney.  Once again, the production was handled by Ted Albert.  The album combines their recent singles ("Wedding Ring", "Sad and Lonely and Blue" and "Women (Make You Feel Alright)") with nine new recordings.

Releases
It was released by Albert Productions on the Parlophone label in Australia on 24 March 1966. The album was only released in mono; no stereo mix was made.  It was reissued by Albert Productions (this time on their own label) in the 1980s on LP and compact disc.  Reissue label Repertoire Records later released the album in 1992 with eleven bonus tracks.  These included b-sides, 1966's Easyfever E.P., album outtakes, alternate mixes from the Good Friday album and an outtake from the group's audition session at EMI Studios, London.

Reception

AllMusic wrote a positive review of the album saying "Most of this album is a respectable piece of mainstream rock & roll, inspired and full of surprises".  The album did very well commercially in Australia, reaching No. 3 on the national charts.

Track listing

Side A

Side B

Personnel
The Easybeats
Stevie Wright - vocals, percussion, electric organ
Harry Vanda - vocals, lead guitar, 12-string guitar
George Young - vocals, rhythm guitar, electric organ
Dick Diamonde - vocals, bass guitar
Snowy Fleet - vocals, bongo, drums
Production Team
Ted Albert - producer
Ian Morgan - front cover photography
Tony Geary - liner notes

Charts

References

External links
 
 MILESAGO - The Easybeats
- The Music Goes 'Round My Head: An unofficial site dedicated to the recorded music of the Easybeats

The Easybeats albums
1966 albums
Albert Productions albums